This is a list of venues used for professional baseball in Rockford, Illinois. The information is a compilation of the information contained in the references listed.

The Commons
Occupant: Forest Citys – independent (1865)
Location: North Whitman Street (southwest); Church Street (southeast)
Currently: Residential
Sources: Filichia, Benson

ballpark unknown
Occupants: Rockford – 2 clubs – Northwestern League 1869–1870
Source: Filichia

Agricultural Society Fair Grounds later renamed Fairgrounds Park
Occupants:
Forest City – independent (1866–1870), NA (1871 only)
Rockford White Stockings – Northwestern League 1879 only
Location: 
Original boundaries: Oak (now Acorn) Street (north); Pecatonica Street and Cherry Street (northeast); buildings and Horsman Street (east); Mulberry Street (south); Kent Creek and St. Paul Railroad (later Milwaukee Road) tracks (west) 
Current boundaries: Harkins Aquatic Center and Acorn Street (north); Kilburn Avenue, buildings and Horsman Street (east); West Jefferson Street aka Business US-20 (south); and Mulberry Street, Kent Creek and railroad tracks (west) – address 900 West Jefferson Street
Sources: Filichia, Benson, Lowry, contemporary maps, Google Maps

North Church Street Grounds
Occupant: Rockford – Central Inter-State League (1888 only)
Location: somewhere on North Church Street (potentially same area as The Commons)
Source: Filichia, local newspapers

West End Park
Occupant: Rockford Hustlers – Illinois–Iowa League (1891–1892)
Location: uncertain
Source: Filichia, local newspapers

Riverside Park
Occupants:
Rockford Reds (aka Nicol Platers – manager Hugh Nicol) / Forest City / Rough Riders – Western Association (1895–1899)
Rockford Red Sox – Three-I League (1901–1904)
Rockford Reds / Hottentots / Indignants / Wolverines – Wisconsin-Illinois League (1908–1912)
Original location listed as north of Auburn Street (city limits) at B Avenue and Melrose Street
Final location listed as Fulton Avenue (north); Oxford Street (east); Van Wie Avenue (south); Cumberland Street (west)
Sources: Filichia, local newspapers, city directories

Kishwaukee Park aka Rockford Base Ball Park – sold to Rockford High School in December 1923
Occupants:
Rockford Indignants (aka Drys) / Wolves – Wisconsin-Illinois League (1913)
Rockford Wakes (aka Rox 1917) – Three-I League (1915 - mid-1917) (league disbanded)
Rockford Rox (aka Bells / Rocks) – Three-I League (1919–1923)
Location: 311-335 15th Avenue; just east of Seminary Street
Sources: Filichia, local newspapers, city directories

Rockford Municipal Stadium aka 15th Avenue Stadium - renamed Beyer Stadium, 1948
Occupants:
Rockford Peaches – All-American Girls Professional Baseball League (1943–1954)
Rockford High School baseball, football, track and field
Location: same as Kishwaukee Park - 311 15th Avenue (north, left field); Seminary Street (west, third base); entrance booth at 15th and Seminary
Sources: Filichia, local newspapers, city directories

Rox Park or 15th Avenue Park
Occupant: Rockford Rox (aka Rocks) – Central Association (1947–1949)
Location: adjacent to Beyer Stadium, just to the east
Currently: Beyer Early Childhood Center and parking lots
Source: local newspapers

Marinelli Field
Occupants:
Rockford Expos / Royals / Cubbies / Reds – Midwest League (1988–1999)
Rockford RiverHawks – Frontier League (2002–2005)
Location: at the north end of Blackhawk Park – 15th Avenue (north, right field); Nelson Boulevard and Rock River (west, left field) – about 4 blocks west of Beyer Stadium – address is 101 15th Avenue
Sources: Filichia, Benson, Google Maps

Aviators Stadium now known as Rivets Stadium; orig. RiverHawks Stadium, then Road Ranger Stadium
Occupants:
Rockford RiverHawks – Frontier League (2006–2009)
Rockford RiverHawks Northern League (2010 only)
Rockford RiverHawks / Aviators – Frontier League (2011–2015)
Location: Loves Park, Illinois – 4503 Interstate Boulevard (west, third base); Orth Road (north, left field); Paladin Parkway (east, right field); Commerce Drive (south, first base)

See also
Lists of baseball parks

References
Peter Filichia, Professional Baseball Franchises, Facts on File, 1993.

Rockford city directories
Rockford newspapers: Register, Gazette, Journal, Star, Republic and various hyphenated combinations thereof

Rockford, Illinois
Rockford
baseball
baseball parks